Viktor Matviishen (born 10 January 2002) is a Ukrainian chess player who holds the title of grandmaster (2022).

Biography
Viktor Matviishen is student of Vinnytsia chess school. He played for Ukraine in European Youth Chess Championships and World Youth Chess Championships in the different age groups and best result reached in 2013 and 2014, when he twice in row won European Youth Chess Championship in the U12 age group. In 2018, in Greece Viktor Matviishen was the second in World Youth Chess Championship in the U16 age group. In 2014, he played for Ukraine team in World Youth U16 Chess Olympiad.

Viktor Matviishen is multiple winner of Ukrainian Youth Chess Championships in different age groups. In 2016, he set a peculiar record of winning Ukrainian Youth Chess Championships in the U16 age group in classical chess, fast chess and blitz chess.

In 2016, Viktor Matviishen won the Fedir Bohatyrchuk chess memorial.

In 2017, he awarded the FIDE International Master (IM) title, and in 2022 he became a grandmaster (GM).

References

External links

Viktor Matviishen chess games at 365chess.com

2002 births
Living people
Ukrainian chess players
Chess grandmasters
Sportspeople from Vinnytsia